Arnold Arturovich Belgardt (29 January 1937 – 26 February 2015) was a  Russian cyclist. He won bronze medals at the 1960 Summer Olympics and the 1962 and 1964 world championships in the 4000 m team pursuit; he won the world title in this event in 1963.

References

1937 births
2015 deaths
Olympic cyclists of the Soviet Union
Cyclists at the 1960 Summer Olympics
Soviet male cyclists
Olympic medalists in cycling
Olympic bronze medalists for the Soviet Union
Medalists at the 1960 Summer Olympics
Cyclists from Saint Petersburg